Samuel Harper may refer to:

 Samuel Hadden Harper (1783–1837), American judge
 Samuel N. Harper (1882–1943), American historian and Slavicist